Vasili Yakovlevich Chichagov (28 February 1726 – 4 April 1809) was an admiral in the Russian Navy and an explorer. He was the father of Pavel Chichagov, a Russian admiral during the Napoleonic Wars.

Background
Joining the Navy at the age of 16, Chichagov was educated in Great Britain. Throughout his life, he would become enthusiastic for all things British, eventually marry an English woman, and spend his last years in the United Kingdom (after he had settled into retirement in 1797).

Expeditions
In 1764, the scientist Lomonosov organized an expedition to find the Northeast Passage between the Atlantic and Pacific oceans by sailing along the northern coast of Siberia.  Chichagov, then serving as the deputy commandant of Arkhangelsk Port, was put in charge of the expedition with three ships, the Chichagov, the Panov and the Babayev. Although he sailed past Svalbard and reached 80°26'N in 1765 and 80°30'N in 1766, both expeditions failed to find the route.

Islands of Novaya Zemlya Archipelago, the Chichagof Island in the Alexander Archipelago in southeastern Alaska, the bay and cape of Nuka Hiva, in the Marquesas Islands of French Polynesia, the inlet Chichagof Harbor on the island of Attu in the Aleutian Islands, and a mountain at Spitzbergen are named after Chichagov.

Military career
During the first Russo-Turkish War, Chichagov was made responsible for the defense of the Kerch Strait, preventing the Ottoman warships from gaining access to the Sea of Azov. When the war over, he administered the ports of Arkhangelsk, Revel, and Kronstadt. During the Russo-Swedish War (1788–1790), he was the Commander-in-chief of the Baltic Fleet. He won the Battle of Öland (1789), Battle of Reval  and the Battle of Vyborg Bay.

References
A. Sokolov. Lomonosov's Project and Chichagov's Expedition. SPb, 1854.

1726 births
1809 deaths
Imperial Russian Navy admirals
Explorers from the Russian Empire
Russian explorers of North America
Russian explorers of the Pacific
Russian and Soviet polar explorers
Recipients of the Order of St. George of the First Degree
Explorers of the United States
Baltic Fleet
Emigrants from the Russian Empire to the United Kingdom
Russian military personnel of the Russo-Swedish War (1788–1790)
Burials at Lazarevskoe Cemetery (Saint Petersburg)